Rasta Taco is a Mexican taco cart catering and fast food restaurant operated by Rasta Taco, Inc., located in Laguna Beach, Orange County, California.

Mario "Maji" Melendez founded Rasta Taco, Inc. in November 2006 while on vacation in Jamaica.  While there, he was astonished to find no tacos at any of the local jerk chicken stands or “corner stores”.  The business plan was written on the back of a cocktail napkin by the pool and upon his return to the United States, Melendez created a mobile Mexican and Jamaican fusion taco cart catering concept.

Rasta Taco catering

Rasta Taco is the first company to establish the novelty "Mom & Pop" taco catering business platform, into a proven catering concept.

Rasta Taco specializes in catering corporate events of any size, private parties, backyard gatherings, weddings and more.

Rasta Taco creates taco entrees and sides with their original recipes of Mexican and Island spices, served directly from their specially-designed and unique mobile taco carts.

Typical Rasta Taco dishes include Caribbean Carne Asada, Jamaican Chicken, Reggae Wraps, Bowls, Salads, and signature sauces and salsas.

Some of their more popular Rasta Taco dishes include the Lee Scratch Breakfast Burrito (named after Lee Scratch Perry ), Peter Burrito,(named after Peter Tosh), Pato Potato Taco (named after Pato Banton), the Haile Selassie Taco Salad (named after Haile Selassie) and the Bob Taco (named after Bob Marley) One Love Taco (Vegan), Jamaican Jerk Chicken Taco, and Rasta Rice.

Rasta Rita 

As the food catering became more successful and more competitive, Melendez expanded his business by developing a mobile margarita truck, Rasta Rita, a subsidiary of Rasta Taco.  The truck was rescued from a junkyard where she sat for several years until Melendez discovered her for sale on E-Bay for $1,000.00.

Rasta Rita delivers fresh, organic Margaritas and specialty cocktails served from a fully restored 1965 GMC bread truck.  Rasta Rita has a cult-like following on social media, as photos of Rasta Rita have been liked, followed or shared more than 10 million times.

Margarita Lady

As the success of Rasta Rita continued, Margarita Lady was launched in 2017 from a restored 1973 Chevy Balboa Vintage RV to assist with the demand of the Margarita truck business.

Rasta Taco Laguna Beach

Melendez opened Rasta Taco's first brick and mortar restaurant in Laguna Beach, Orange County, California in 2016.  The restaurant is located in the heart of downtown Laguna Beach, California (92651) and has a small beer and wine patio.  It is the smallest restaurant in California coming in at 220 ft.² and has a reggae-rasta- themed look serving authentic Mexican street tacos and a variety of Mexican craft and Jamaican beers.

Rasta Taco Jamaica

Melendez opened a Rasta Taco taco shop on the island of Jamaica at Island Village, Ocho Rios, owned by legendary record producer and founder of Island records Chris Blackwell (Island Outpost, Goldeneye, Strawberry Hill, The Caves).

Rasta Taco Jamaica is the first taco shop on the Island and opened in 2017 and is located near Dunns River Falls in the heart of Saint Ann Parish, Jamaica at Ocho Rios Cruise Port Terminal.

Due to COVID and travel restrictions in 2020, Rasta Taco was forced to cease operations until further notice.

Rasta Rita Cantina and Venue

Rasta Rita Cantina & Venue is located in the charming and historic town of the high desert Twentynine Palms, California, dubbed "The Gateway to Joshua Tree".   Purchased in August 2020, the once USMC Supply Building has gone through extensive renovations.  The Cantina will open in Spring 2021 and will feature Signature Premium Margaritas and a limited food menu.  Live music acts and Community events will be part of the High Desert agenda.

References

External links
Rasta Taco Catering Homepage
CSUM EDU
Jamaica Observer
Ocweekly
Rasta Taco Corporate Homepage
Orange County Register Profile
Orange County Coast Magazine
OCFocus.com Profile
Lariat News Profile
Dana Point Times
San Clemente Times
Dreadhead Times
Laguna Beach Independent
Orange County Register

Fast casual restaurants
American companies established in 2007
Privately held companies based in California